A waiter is a server of food and beverage.

Waiter or The Waiter may also refer to:

Film
Waiter!, 1983 French film
Waiter (film), 2006 Dutch film
The Waiter (film), 2018 Greek film

Music
The Waiter Chapters 1 - 7, 2008 album by The Black Heart Procession
"The Waiter," a song by The Black Heart Procession from the 1998 album 1
"The Waiter #2" and "The Waiter #3", Black Heart Procession songs from 1999 album 2
"The Waiter #4" Black Heart Procession song from 2002 album Amore del Tropico
"The Waiter #5," Black Heart Procession song from 2006 album The Spell

Other uses
Waiter (customs), British and English border enforcement and customs officers
Waiter.com, an online restaurant delivery service

See also
Waiters (disambiguation)
Waiter Rant, a weblog written by ex-waiter Steve Dublanica